Municipio V (or Municipality 5) is one of the 15 administrative subdivisions of the city of Rome in Italy. It is in the eastern part of the capital.

References

External links 

Municipi of Rome